= ASER =

ASER may refer to:

- Adelaide Station and Environs Redevelopment of Adelaide railway station, in Australia
- Appraisal subordination entitlement reduction, a commercial mortgage-backed security structuring innovation
- Aser, a vocalisation of Egyption god Osiris
